Pteroxygonum giraldii is a species of flowering plant in the family Polygonaceae, endemic to the Chinese provinces of Gansu, Hebei, Henan, Hubei, Shaanxi, Shanxi, and Sichuan.

References

 "Reappraisal of the generic status of Pteroxygonum (Polygonaceae) on the basis of morphology, anatomy and nrDNA ITS sequence analysis", Wei SUN et al., Journal of Systematics and Evolution 46 (1): 73–79 (2008). 
 eFloras description

Polygonoideae
Taxa named by Carl Lebrecht Udo Dammer
Taxa named by Ludwig Diels